Oxylopsebus is a genus of beetle in the family Cerambycidae, it contains a single species Oxylopsebus brachypterus. It was described by Clarke in 2008.

References

Cerambycinae
Beetles described in 2008